Mukrampur Khema is a census town in Bijnor district in the Indian state of Uttar Pradesh.

Demographics
 India census, Mukrampur Khema had a population of 11,127. Males constitute 53% of the population and females 47%. Mukrampur Khema has an average literacy rate of 52%, lower than the national average of 59.5%: male literacy is 57%, and female literacy is 47%. In Mukrampur Khema, 20% of the population is under 6 years of the age.

References

Cities and towns in Bijnor district